The Golden Crab is a Greek fairy tale collected as "Prinz Krebs" by Bernhard Schmidt in his Griechische Märchen, Sagen and Volkslieder.  Andrew Lang included it in The Yellow Fairy Book.

Greek folklorist  collected a variant, The Crab, in Folktales of Greece.

It is Aarne-Thompson type 425D, Vanished Husband learned of by keeping inn.

Synopsis

Schmidt's variant
Bernhard Schmidt (de) stated that his version was originally titled "Οἱ δώδεκα ἀετοί" ("Oí dódeka áetoi"; "The Twelve Eagles") by the narrator. He also compared the 12 eagles of the Greek tale to the 12 pigeons in the Albanian tale from von Hahn.

One day a fisherman, who had a wife and three children, caught a golden crab with the rest of his fish.  He took it home, and the crab told his wife, (who was cleaning the other fish) to let down her skirt, her feet were showing.  That evening, the crab asked to be given dinner, and when they did, they found his plate was filled with gold.  This happened every night.

One day, the crab told the fisherman's wife to tell the king that he (the crab) wanted to marry his (the king's) younger daughter.  The king, guessing he was an enchanted prince, demanded that the crab build a wall in front of the castle, higher than the highest tower, and blooming with flowers, and then a garden with three fountains that played gold, diamonds, and brilliants.  When this was done, the king agreed.

The crab sent the fisherman to fetch rich garments for himself and his bride, and had himself carried to the castle on a golden cushion.  After the wedding, he told his bride that he was an enchanted prince, a crab by day and a man by night, though he could change himself into an eagle whenever he liked.  They spent their nights together, and soon the princess had a son.

The king held another tournament, decreeing that if any of the knights pleased his daughter, that knight would be selected by her, and she would marry him and would leave the crab.  The method of selection was to be a golden apple - thrown to the king's daughter by whichever knight she selected. The crab sent the princess to give orders for his golden armor and steed, and his golden apple, to be brought to him.  He warned her that he would be the knight to throw her the golden apple, but she must not reveal that he is the crab.  When she was not pleased with any of the princes, the king held a second tournament.  The crab was certain that his wife would betray him this time, but went again.  When he threw her the golden apple, her mother boxed her ears, demanding to know why even that knight did not please her, and the princess confessed it was the crab.  The queen ran back to their rooms, saw the crab shell, and burned it.  The princess wept bitterly, but her husband did not return.

An old man went to dip some bread in water when a dog stole it from him.  He chased after the dog, and found a palace.  Twelve eagles flew in and became young men.  They toasted the health of some family member—a father, a mother—and the last toasted his wife but cursed the mother who burned his shell.  The old man heard the princess was ill, and that the only thing that consoled her was hearing stories.  He went to the castle to tell his, and the princess went with him to the palace.  When her husband gave that toast, she ran to him.  He asked if she would stay with him the three months until the enchantment was done.  She agreed and sent back the old man to tell her parents.  They were not pleased, but when the three months were done, the prince and princess went back home and were happy.

Megas's variant
They were so fond of each other that they agreed that their children would marry. The queen gave birth to a daughter, and the priest's wife to a crab. When the crab and the princess were grown, the crab asked the king to fulfill his promise. The king asked him to remove a nearby mountain in one night. The crab did so, and the marriage was held. He took off his shell at night and became a handsome young man, but cautioned his wife to silence. The princess was pleased, but her mother was grief-stricken. On Sundays, the crab sent his wife to church ahead of him and came in human form; her mother said that the prince must have come to woo her and she lost him by marrying the crab. On the third Sunday, the queen wept so much that her daughter feared she would become ill, and the princess revealed the truth. When she went back, the crab was gone.

She had three pairs of iron shoes made and wandered the world until she had worn out two.  Then she built an inn and asked all travellers for news.  Two beggars came.  One told how he had tried to eat some bread, but when he dipped it into a stream to soften it, the current bore it off.  He had chased it to a palace, where he was forbidden to eat until the lords had eaten.  Three doves flew in and turned to young men.  Two toasted the health of a fair one who could not keep a secret, and ordered the windows and doors to weep; they wept, and the young men wept with them.  The third toasted the fair lady who could not keep her promise for one more day, and wept with the windows and doors.  When they were done, the beggar ate and left.  The princess asked him to lead her there.  The oven and cauldron welcomed her, and the door told her to hide behind it.  When the first two men gave their toasts, the doors and windows wept, but when the third did, they laughed.  He went to break them, and found his wife.  She threw his wings on the fire and saved him from possible danger or death.

Kretschmer's variant
German linguist Paul Kretschmer collected a similar tale from the island of Lesbos with the title Die Krebs ("The Crab"), which was translated by Richard McGillivray Dawkins in his book Modern Greek Folktales. In this tale, a childless woman lives just before the palace. Seeing the children playing about, she declares she will have a child, even if it is a crab. So God gives her one. After the crab is born, she takes him to play with other human children, but their parents don't allow their children to play with him.

In time, the crab grows larger and larger. One day, the mother leaves home and returns later, only to find the kitchen clean. She pretends to leave the next day, and sees that a young man comes out of the crab shell to do the chores. The woman surprises him, and he confesses he is the crab, and convinces his mother to go to the palace and ask for the hand of the princess in marriage.

The woman goes to the king in her son's stead, and the king orders the crab to fulfill some tasks first: to build a palace, with a garden with all types of trees and fruits; and to have the Sun illuminate the garden. The crab fulfills both tasks, and his mother goes to the king's court to announce her son is to marry the king's daughter. The princess's sisters complain that she is marrying a crab, not a prince, but the princess answers that it is her fate.

The princess and the crab marry. One day, the whole kingdom is abuzz due to a festival or some such. The crab tells his wife he will take part in the competition as a human rider on a black horse, but she cannot tell anything to her sisters. He goes to the festival and returns home. Next, the crab comes in red clothes, and returns home. Every time, the princess's sisters mock her for her choice of husband. On the third day, the crab warns his wife that, this time, she will betray him, but she assures him she will not. At any rate, the crab goes to the festival as a man, and the princess, in a moment of pride, reveals the youth is her husband, the crab. The youth disappears.

The princess orders the construction of an inn and a tailor's workshop, where people can come, eat, tell stories and get finer clothes. One day, a blind man and his son Wohlan want to go to the inn. They walk a bit and stop by a river. The boy takes out a loaf of bread, but it slips from his hands and rolls out on the ground. The bread just keeps rolling, and the boy follows it until it stops near a palace. The boy enters the palace and sees three doves coming, becoming men and making a toast to someone.

The boy and his blind father go to the princess's inn and tells the whole story. The princess goes to the same castle and sees the three doves. The three birds become man and the third makes a toast to the one that betrayed him. The princess reveals herself and intends to release him from the "Drachin", although her husband says she cannot do so. Eventually, the princess faces off the Drachin, who makes her choose her husband, and she chooses the middle one.

Analysis
The tale is related to the cycle of the Animal as Bridegroom or the Search for the Lost Husband, and classified in the international Aarne-Thompson-Uther Index as type ATU 425D, "The Vanished Husband". This type refers to a human girl marrying a supernatural husband in animal form; she betrays his secret and he disappears. In order to find him, she builds an inn, hospital or bath house to listen to passers-by's stories. One day, she listens to a person's narration about a flock of birds transforming into men in a place somewhere. The heroine recognizes it is about her husband and asks to be taken there.

According to Georgios A. Megas, the main motif of the tale type is H11.1.1, "Recognition at inn [hospital, etc.], where all must tell their life histories".

Variants

Europe

Italy
The "Istituto centrale per i beni sonori ed audiovisivi" ("Central Institute of Sound and Audiovisual Heritage") promoted research and registration throughout the Italian territory between the years 1968–1969 and 1972.

Greece
According to Emmanouela Katrinaki, Greek variants of type ATU 425E, Enchanted Husband Sings Lullaby, "almost always" appear in combination with type 425D.

Albania
Austrian consul Johann Georg von Hahn collected an Albanian tale titled Taubenliebe: a king wants his only daughter to find a husband. One day, a dove flies into her room and talks to her. The dove tells her to have a milk bowl ready for it the next day. The dove returns, bathes in the milk and becomes a handsome youth. The youth warns her to never tell anyone about him, and to wait for him for three years. They exchange rings as a vow. Some time later, the queen wants to betroth the princess to a suitor, but she mentions she is already betrothed. After, the dove does not return, and she goes on a quest for him for three years, walking in iron shoes and with three iron canes. Her quest is not successful, and she returns home. She asks her parents to build a bath house, and that any guest can enter by telling a story. One day, the daughter of a woman that lives in town wants to go to the bath house, but first she goes to the fountain to get some water. At the spring, she sees a rooster with footwear. The girl follows the rooster to a garden and to a house. Inside the house, she spies on 11 pigeons flying into the room, bathing in milk and becoming men. A 12th pigeon appears and mopes about his fiancée, who betrayed the secret. The girl returns to her mother and both decide to go to the princess's bath house to tell her the story. The tale was translated by Angelo de Gubernatis  as Il Principe Colombo ("The Pigeon Prince"); by Parker Fillmore as The Pigeon's Bride: The Story of a Princess who Kissed and Told (sourced as from Yugoslavia), and by Albanologist Robert Elsie as For the Love of a Dove.

Romania
Romanian folklorist  collected a Romanian variant titled Fratele bucăţică ("Brother Little Morsel"). In this tale, a carpenter and a mason are great friends and promise to unite their families by marrying their first born children to each other. The carpenter's wife gives birth to a girl, while the mason's wife gives birth to a morsel of meat. Despite their appearance, the morsel of meat does talk like a human being. Seeing his future son-in-law, the carpenter refuses to marry his daughter to the morsel, but the mason brings the demand to the Emperor, who forces the carpenter to uphold his word. Thus, his daughter is married to the morsel of meat. At night, in the bedchambers, the morsel of meat turns into a human being and tells his wife that he is cursed into that form, but she can help him break the curse if she does not say anything to anyone. Eventually, the girl lets slip the secret, and Bucăţică disappears. Meanwhile, next to a river, two beggars, a blind man and a lame man, bicker a bit for lost bread, until the lame man sees a palace in the distance. The pair goes to the palace, but no one seems to inhabit it. In one of the rooms, they see a table set with dishes. Suddenly, a window opens, and ten pigeons come in, become men and sit at the table, waiting for their brother Bucăţică. Bucăţică appears as a pigeon, turns into a man and sits at the table, but does not enjoy the food, for he still misses his wife. The men leave the table, the two beggars fetch the remaining food and leave. The beggars walk for two days until they reach a large bath house, where travellers come to take a bath and tell stories. The beggars are given a bath, a shave and new clothes, and go to talk to their hostess, Bucăţică's wife. They tell her about the palace with the 11 pigeons, and she asks to be taken there. The carpenter's daughter sees the pigeons and her husband, and goes to hug him.

Asia

Turkey
Turkish folklorist Pertev Naili Boratav collected a tale from his mother. In her tale, titled "Ослиная голова" ("Donkey's Head"), an old couple have no sons. One day, the man is ploughing the fields and mutters to himself that Allah did not give him sons. Suddenly, a black man (or dervish) appears to him and gives him an apple, for the man to eat half and his wife to eat the other half. The man doubts the effectiveness of the apple and eats it whole. Nine months later, a donkey's head bursts out of his body. The man digs up a hole, buries the donkey's head, and returns home. Soon after, they hear the donkey's head voice shouting for them. The couple decide to take the creature, wrap it and throw it in the sea. The donkey's head survives and the couple, resigning themselves, raise it as their son. Some twenty years later, the donkey's head tells them he wants to marry the padishah's daughter. The donkey's head magically produces a lavish carriage to take his mother to the padishah to ask for her hand in marriage in her son's stead. The padishah agrees to it, but orders first a palace to be built next to his. The donkey's head also creates the palace, and sets a condition for his bride: she is to come alone. The padishah's daughter goes to the bridegroom's palace and enters a room. She sees a tray nearby with a cloth on it. The girl takes off the cloth and sees the donkey's head. The creature falls on the ground and becomes a handsome man. He tells his bride not to reveal the secret to anyone, not even the slaves that serve their palace. One day, however, the padishah's daughter's nanny spies on her ward and sees the donkey's head. She screams. The donkey's head laments the fact, and tells his wife that he will leave, then vanishes. The padishah's daughter grieves for her lost husband and asks her father to build a bathhouse for her, where everyone can take a bath, in exchange for telling their stories. One day, a boy named Keloglan asks his mother to go to the bathhouse. Keloglan goes to the river and dozes off. By moonlight, he wakes up and thinks it is daylight, then sees a strange sight unfold before him: two men come with forty mules, one chops firewood and the other loads the forewood on the mules. Keloglan follows the mules and reaches an underground chamber. The mules disappear and boiling cauldrons appear. Keloglan wanders a bit more and enters another room: donkey's head comes, turns into a man and sits at a table; a dove flies in, takes a bath and becomes a maiden; the maiden tries to comfort the man, but he rebuffs her; the maiden turns back into a dove and flies away. Keloglan returns to his mother and suggests they tell the padishah's daughter in the bath house. The padishah's daughter listens to the boy's tale and asks to be taken there. The padishah's daughter follows the same trail and reaches the underground chamber. She hides in a closet and sees donkey's head and the dove come to the room. After the dove maiden leaves, donkey's head notices his human wife's presence and tells her the daughter of the padishah of the peris made him her prisoner. Donkey's head tells his wife to build a large cage with outward spikes: the couple is to enter it, so that the daughter of the padishah of the peris and her flying army will try to kill them, but will instead destroy themselves in the spikes. It happens thus; donkey's head is freed from his captor, and returns with his human wife to her kingdom.

Iraq
In a dialectal variant from Baghdad with the title ich-chelb‿il-eswed ("The Black Dog"), a couple has no children, but the wife wishes to have a daughter, and makes a promise to marry her to whoever asks for her hand, even if it is a black dog. A daughter is born and 16 years later, a black dog appears to her to remind her of her mother's promise. The girl is given to the black dog as wife and they move to a new house. Once there, the black dog takes off the canine skin and becomes a handsome man. He gives her a casket of jewellery and tells his wife not to reveal the secret to any stranger. The girl goes to the women's bath and is insulted for marrying a dog, but she proclaims her husband is better than any of their husbands. Later that night, the girl awaits for her husband to come, but he never does, and she goes back to her mother. The girl asks her mother to build a bath house, where any guest may tell her news of her husband. One day, an old woman passes by the bath house and narrates a strange occurrence that happened to her: before dawn, on a moonlit night, she followed a camel to a house, where 40 birds alighted and became men, the last of them standing near a fountain with a piece of jewelry and laments over his lost love, the entire house weeping with him. The girl at the bath house begs the old woman to take her there where she saw the camel, the house and the birds. The event repeats and, when the last man laments over his lost love, the entire house laughs instead of weeping. His love, the girl, reveals herself and they reconcile. Scholar Hasan El-Shamy classified this tale as both type ATU 425A and type ATU 425D.

In an Iraqi tale collected by novelist and ethnologist E. S. Drower with the title The Thorn-Seller or Shawwāk, a poor thorn-seller brings home a gourd. Suddenly, the gourd begins to talk and tells the thorn-seller, whom he regards as his adoptive father, to court the king's princess as a wife for him. The thorn-seller goes to the king with his son's proposal, and the king orders him to build a palace made of gold and precious gems. With the gourd's magic powers, a palace is built. The king is convinced to give his daughter's hand in marriage to the thorn-seller's son. The princess awaits for her husband, but a sparrow comes to her room. The bird takes off the birdskin, reveals he is her husband and asks her not to reveal the secret. One day, she goes to a women-only public bath and overhears the mocking gossip about her marriage. She then tells the women about her husband's true form. Sensing his wife betrayed her vow, the bird steals some of her jewels as a memento, then flies away. Some time later, the princess builds a bath house where everyone can bathe for free in exchange for a tale. An old woman comes and tells a curious story: when she was going to the river to wash her clothes, she saw a rooster coming out of the river; she held onto the rooster's tail and was carried off to an underwater castle, inside, 40 doves came to a pool near the castle and became maidens, then a man came and cried over a lost love. The princess asks the old woman to guide her to the river. In her notes, Drower reported two similar tales. In the first, the supernatural husband was a white snake, whose snake skin the heroine's jealous sisters threw in the fire, and that the kitchen utensils cry with him. In a second story, a bird steals a princess's comb; the tale continues much like The Thorn-Seller: the woman at the river sees a stallion filling waterskins; then, inside the secret palace, the bird becomes a man, yearns with love for the princess, and bids the trees to weep with him.

Israel
Scholar  described a similar narrative, present in the Jewish Oriental tale corpus and which she named AaTh 425*Q, "Marvelous Being Woos Princess". According to her tale type, a son of supernatural origin (either adopted or born to human parents) instructs his parents to woo the princess; he marries the princess; due to some action by the princess, the husband disappears; some time later, a person follows a strange animal to an underground palace, where the supernatural husband is seen with other companions; the person relates the incident to the princess in her inn or bath house.

In an Israeli tale titled The Camel's Wife, a barren woman is instructed by a stranger to go to the desert and drink from a certain well. She does and nine months later she gives birth to a baby in the shape of a camel. One day, the camel tells his mother to ask for the king's youngest daughter as wife. The king agrees to the camel son's proposal, but he has to find three items first: a carpet large enough to accommodate the army and when rolled up it could fit in a nut; a branch of grapes that could feed the army, and there would still be some on the cluster; and a watermelon with rind of gold and pits of precious gems. The camel instructs his mother to go to a cave and shout three times "The camel is dead, the camel is alive" (Met hakamal, chai hakamal); a voice will answer that "it should never be" (Khas v’ha leela) and give her the objects. The camel fulfills the requests and marries the princess. On the wedding night, the camel explains that he is human beneath the camelskin and that the princess must never reveal the secret. He then takes off the fur and becomes a man. One day, war breaks out in the kingdom and the princess begs her husband to help her father. The camel husband becomes human, fights in the war and gets injured. The king sees the warrior and wraps a handkerchief around the injury. When the king's sons-in-law return home, the princess's older sisters mock her about her animal husband, and she reveals her husband is indeed human. The elder sisters convince her to burn the camel fur. She does; the camel husband, in human form, tells the princess that she will only find him after walking with an iron cane and wearing iron clogs on her feet, turns into a bird and vanishes. The king builds a bath house where people are to tell unusual stories. One day, a woman comes to the bath house and tells a strange story: on a moonlit night, one the way to the market to buy thread, she saw a camel and a beetle and followed them to a cave; inside the cave, bread was baking by itself in the oven; three doves came with a tablecloth, opened it and exhorted the house to cry and weep with them. The princess asks the woman to guide her to the cave, with the iron cane and the iron clogs. They follow the camel and the beetle and enter the cave. They see the doves, which tell the house to smile and laugh. The princess sees her husband and reconciles with him.

Palestine
In a Palestinian version from Birzeit, collected by orientalist Paul E. Kahle with the title Der verzauberte Jussif ("The Enchanted Jussif"), an old merchant named Nassireddin finds a camel outside his house and he and his wife take him in as son. One day, the camel signs with his head that he wants a wife. A Fellachenmädchen interprets the camel's head gesture that he must seek a wife among the merchant class. Nassireddin finds as a prospective bride a friend's daughter. The merchant friend asks Nassireddin about his son, but Nassireddin spins a story about his son never leaving the house for fear of the Sun and the moon and the people's stares. At any rate, the camel marries the merchant's daughter, and she gives birth to three boys in the following years. One day, the merchant's daughter and her sisters go for a walk and talk about her husbands, and she reveals her husband, the camel, is actually a handsome youth who rides a white horse. She goes back home and notices her husband and sons's absence. The tale then flashbacks to when the camel husband showed his true form under the camelskin, with a warning that, if she reveals the secret, the camel husband will disappear with their children. In the present time, the merchant's daughter builds a bath (house). One day, a middle-aged fellahin woman comes to the bath to tell a story in exchange for using the facilities. The fellahin woman narrates her tale: on a moonlit night, by an olive tree, she saw 40 birds; the birds took a bath, ate, drank and flew away; a hen and a rooster told the wind and the rain to come; a man lamented to three children about his wife Warde (Rose) who had betrayed his secret. The merchant's daughter and the fellahin woman go to the olive tree to wait for the birds to come. The birds come; the merchant's daughter tries to convince her family to come back. Her husband promises to heed her pleas. The next day, he brings the children back with him to their mother. Hasan El-Shamy classified this tale as both type ATU 425A and type ATU 425D.

In a tale published by author Inea Bushnaq with the title The Camel Husband, a barren woman sees mothers carrying and playing with their children and longs to have her own son, even it is a newborn camel. She prays to God and, nine months later, she gives birth to a camel she names "Jumail". One day, Jumail asks his mother to find him a wife. A peasant girl is brought to him as a prospective bride, but he only wants the sultan's youngest daughter. His mother goes to the sultan to ask for his daughter's hand in marriage. She explains his son is a little camel. The sultan laughs at her and orders him to produce as bride-price his daughter's weight in gold. The next day, Jumail guides the sultan's men to a cave filled with gold, silver and precious gems. Defeated, the sultan agrees to marry his youngest daughter, Princess Ward, to him. She enters Jumail's chambers; he reveals he is a man under the camel skin, the son of the king of the jinns, and that she cannot betray his secret. One day, war breaks out, and Jumail, in human form, goes to fight for the kingdom. When he returns with the army, Princess Ward talks about the warrior being her husband, the camel, and he disappears. Some time later, the sultan builds a bath house where everyone can bathe in exchange for a story. A woman comes to the bath house and tells the princess about a tree in a place somewhere, where the ground cracked open and a prince came out of the opening with a retinue. Princess Ward asks the woman to be guided to that exact spot.

Kurdish people
Kurdologist Roger Lescot collected a tale from the Kurdish people with the title Çîroka Qundirê, translated into French as Conte de la Courge ("Tale of the Gourd"), into German as Der Kürbis ("The Gourd"), and into Russian by Kurdologist Margarita Rudenko with the title "Сказка о Тыкве" ("Tale of the Pumpkin"). In this tale, a poor herdsman and his wife live a cave away from the village. The woman gives birth to a gourd. The herdsman places the gourd on a shelf. One day. The gourd begins to talk to the man and convinces him to ask for the "daughter of the prince" as wife for him. The man goes to the prince to ask for his daughter's hand on behalf of his son. The prince orders the man to show up the next day with a cavalry of 40 men dressed in red garments. The gourd is informed of this and tells his father to go a certain rock and shout to a Ehmed Xan that his brother, Mhemmed Xan, needs his help. The herdsman presents the prince the army and his daughter is given to the gourd. She rides a horse to meet the future husband. She is led inside the cave, while the couple leaves the cave. The gourd falls down the shelf and cracks open, and a handsome youth named Mhemmed Xan appears to his wife. He asks her to prepare him coffee without bubbling it, otherwise he will disappear. The princess forgets his request and he disappears. She wanders off to look for him in iron shoes, but to no avail. She then asks her father, the prince, to build a hotel in a seven-way crossroads, so that anyone might tell where they have seen Mhemmed Xan. One day, a blind man and his 7-year-old son stop to rest near a large rock. While the man sleeps, the large rock cracks open and the boy enters it. Inside, a large room with marble walls. Suddenly, 40 doves fly into the room, become men and repose on 40 couches. A youth with a gloomy expression strums his sitar, while a woman serves food for the 40 men, who become doves again and leave. The boy exits the marble room and continues his journey with his father. They reach the princess's hotel, where they stay the night. The princess listens to the boy's story and asks to be taken to the large rock. They enter the rock and she notices Mhemmed Xan's emaciated appearance. His mother tries to nudge him into eating some food, since for the past seven years he has been pining for a girl. As soon as his mother retires, the princess touches Mhemmed Xan. He tells her that his mother won't accept his marriage and that they have to escape. The leave the cave, but a rooster crows to the mother that her son escaped. Mhemmed Xan and the princess change into a shepherd (him) and a sheep (her), and into a miller (him) and a customer (her). The mother claims she will turn them to dust unless his wife is more beautiful than him. Mhemmed Xan shows his wife to his mother and she gives the couple her blessing.

Kurdologists Ordîxanê Jalîl, Celîlê Celîl and Zine Jalil collected another Kurdish tale in 1974 from informant Cherkes Ashir, from Yerevan. In this tale, titled "Змееныш" ("The Little Snake"), a shepherd and his wife have longed to have a son, so God makes a snake crawl out of the wife's mouth as answer to their prayers. Time passes, and the little snake aks his father to make a bid for the hand of the padishah's daughter. The shepherd father goes to the padishah's court and sits on the matchmaking chair. The padishah laughs at the poor man's proposal, and confabulates with his viziers to set impossible tasks for the man that, if he fails, will result in his decapitation: first, he is to give him seven camels with loads on their backs, driven by an Arab man; second, to build a palace equal to the padishah's, and third, to unroll a carpet between the padishah's palace and the shepherd's house, with gardens on each side of the carpet and with nightingales singing. The snake son fulfills the requests, and gets to marry to the padishah's daughter. The padishah's daughter goes to the snake son's house and enter the bedroom: the snake son takes off the snakeskin and becomes a young man. Meanwhile, the padishah sends his wife to his son-in-law's house to see if his son is a snake. The padishah's wife is greeted by her daughter, who lies that her husband is away on a hunt. The padishah's wife spies behind a door the snake son-in-law take off the snakeskin; she seizes the opportunity to take the snakeskin and throw it in the fire. The young man laments the fact, warns his wife she will not find him until she hears from the 40 dervishes, becomes a bird and flies away. The padishah's daughter grieves for her lost husband, and her father-in-law and the padishah build her a "хератхан" ("Herathan"), where she welcomes travellers with food and bed, but they must share a story with her. One day, a blind father and his son named Ahmad go to fetch water, when the boy meets another boy named Ahmad, whom he befriends. The second Ahmad goes to a mountain, a rock door opens and asks if Ahmad brought the water to "forty dervishes". The boy answers yes, then goes out of the mountain. The first Ahmad goes back to his blind father, tells the whole story and both go to the padishah's daughter to tell her the occurrence. After listening to their story, she asks to be brought to the mountain where the rock opens. The padishah's daughter sees the second boy Ahmad and follows him through the rock door, meets her husband and embraces him.

Iran
In his Catalogue of Persian Folktales, German scholar  located a similar tale from Azerbaijan region, in Iran, which he classified as a new Iranian type *425D, Tierbräutigam durch Geschichtenerzählen wiedergefunden ("Animal Husband found by telling stories"). In the single entry of the type, a princess falls in love with a blue bird; she builds a bathhouse, where a man named Kačal comes to tell a story about the location of her husband; the princess goes to her husband's location and kills the 40 fairies that kept him captive.

Africa

Egypt
In an Egyptian variant collected by Yacoub Artin Pacha with the title Les quarante boucs, ou le bouc chevauchant sur le bouc ("The 40 Goats, or, The Goat Riding a Goat"), a sultan has three daughters of marriageable age. He announces the princesses are to throw a handkerchief to their possible suitors who pass by their window. The two elders throw theirs to princes, while the third's falls near a goat. The princess repeats the action and her handkerchief still falls on the goat, to the crowd's amusement. The third princess marries the goat in a grand ceremony and leaves with him for their honeymoon. After the doors close, the goat takes off its skin and becomes a human youth of peerless beauty. He explains that he is an emir that was cursed by the sorcerers, and that she must not reveal the secret to anyone, otherwise he will disappear. Time passes, and war erupts. The princess's father, the sultan, is too old to fight, so he sends his three sons-in-law, the princes and the goat. His army victorious, the three sons-in-law return for a celebratory parade, and he third princess throws a rose to a mysterious man that rides along with the two princes. The parade continues on for two more days, and the princess throws a jasmin to the rider on the second day and a tamarin flower on the third. The princess's sisters suspect something afoul with their sister's behaviour and tell the sultan. The sultan confronts his daughter about it and she tells him about the goat's secret. The goat vanishes. The princess becomes saddened and builds a bath house, so that other women can share their woes with her. One day, a poor old woman comes to the bath house to share her story: she was washing herself in the river, when she saw three mules. She followed the mules, which descended through an opening into the ground to a grand room with 40 seats and a larger one. The old woman saw the arrival of 40 goats, plus a goat riding a goat; they sat on the seats and their skins peeled off to reveal 40 young men. The man sat on the larger seat cried over his love, "Princess of Beauty and Grace" (the heroine's name), and his companions, and the whole room, cried with him. After the old woman finishes her tale, the princess, named Sitt-el-Husna, asks to be taken there. The old woman takes the princess to the underground room; they see the same 40 goats enter, sit on the seats and take off their skins. The last goat enters, becomes a man and weeps over his lost love, but his companions and the room laugh, instead of crying with him. The princess appears before her husband and they reconcile. Author Ruth Manning-Sanders translated the tale as The Forty Goats, in her book A Book of Charms and Changelings. Orientalist J. C. Mardrus also included the tale as The He-Goat and the King’s Daughter in his translation of The Arabian Nights.

Tunisia
In a Jewish-Tunisian tale titled La Tête d'Âne ("The Donkey's Head"), a poor old woman decides to try her luck by spending the night in a apparently haunted magasin (storeroom), since if she is still alive by dawn she will have the storeroom for herself. At a certain time of the night, a donkey's head appears to her; she invites it closer and the donkey's head thanks her, saying it is a sultan's son cursed by his enemies for loving a young lady. The old woman is still alive by morning light and gains the storehouse, and lives with the donkey's head. The donkey's head asks the old woman to go to the town's sultan and ask for the hand of his youngest daughter in marriage. The old woman produces a box of expensive jewels as her dowry and the sultan's daughter becomes interested in marrying a rich donkey's head. The girl follows the old woman to her storehouse and becomes disappointed when she sees the humble store. She begins to cry, but a young man wearing a robe of emeralds appears, embraces her and leads the women to a table filled with the finest dishes. He explains that this secret can only stay between them, and that the sultan's daughter must lie to anyone of her family that her married life is a poor one, otherwise he will disappear. And so it happens for some time. One day, the prince tells his wife an enemy army will invade the kingdom, but he will fight for her father's army in ruby garments. He joins the war and defeats the enemy army. When the army and the mysterious rider march in during the victory parade, the sultan's daughter reveals the mysterious rider is her husband. He disappears; the sultan's daughter becomes ill and the old woman at the storehouse delivers her to her parents. Meanwhile, in another country, another poor woman is blown away by a fierce gust of wind and reaches another place near the sea. A man appears to her and they bathe in the sea. When night comes, they seek shelter in a manor, where a richly dressed man cuts an apple in four pieces, offering each of them to a person: his father, his mother and to someone who is far away. He then pleads the manor to weep with him, the doors, the ceiling and the tables. The second old woman learns about the sultan's daughter's illness and pays her a visit. After being paid, she tells her the story and the sultan's daughter asks to be taken to the manor. Both women see the man cutting the apple, but, when he begs the entryway to weep, it laughs and announces that his wife is there. The man sees her and embraces her.

See also

 Hans My Hedgehog
 The Brown Bear of Norway
 Prince Crawfish
 Princess Himal and Nagaray
 The Tale of the Woodcutter and his Daughters
 The Little Crab

References

Greek fairy tales
Fictional princes
Fictional crabs
Fiction about shapeshifting
Animal tales
ATU 400-459